Wang Jiang, may refer to:

Wang Jiang (Queen consort), Queen consort of King Kang of Zhou.

Wang Jiang (banker), Chinese banker and the current party secretary of China Everbright Group, president of the Bank of China and China Construction Bank.